YACHTICO is an international yacht charter, it offers rentals of professional crewed and bare boat yacht. Headquartered in Boca Raton, Florida with operations in Europe Berlin and China.

History 

YACHTICO was founded by Steffen Brünn and Ron Hillmann in 2010 and launched the yacht vacation booking platform in May 2011 in Germany, Austria and Switzerland with a European focus. YACHTICO started with almost 10,000 yachts operated by local charter companies mainly in Europe and in the Caribbean. The company's initial investment came through the founder and angel investors in US, Germany and Switzerland.

The beta version of the site went live in May 2011.

In 2015, YACHTICO announced the creation of 50 new jobs in Boca Raton.

In 2017, YACHTICO was the winner of the "Florida Companies to Watch" award.

In 2020 YACHTICO was listed among the Top 3 yacht charter companies in the U.S. for bare boat charters.

Operation 
YACHTICO moved its headquarter to the United States in 2015. The company's team has a joint history with Research Park at Florida Atlantic University and hired some of their key people directly from the Florida Atlantic University.

YACHTICO works with professional local yacht charter companies and has strong presence in Mediterranean Sea, Caribbean, Thailand and Malaysia.

All yachts can be chartered with an optional crew. A majority is also available as bare boat charter. Since October 2015 YACHTICO yacht vacations are available within the Sabre travel agency network. Since 2017 YACHTICO is the only Yacht Charter Supplier in the Travel Leaders Network.

References

External links 
 

Yachting
Companies based in Boca Raton, Florida
2010 establishments in Florida
American companies established in 2010